The coastal sheath-tailed bat (Taphozous australis), or coastal tomb bat, is a species of sheath-tailed bat in the family Emballonuridae. It is found in Australia and Papua New Guinea.

References

Taphozous
Bats of Oceania
Bats of Australia
Mammals of Papua New Guinea
Mammals of Queensland
Mammals of New South Wales
Mammals described in 1854
Taxonomy articles created by Polbot
Bats of New Guinea